José Antonio García Leyva (11 January 1960 – 28 November 2003) was a Mexican politician and educator from the Institutional Revolutionary Party. From 2000 to 2003 he served as Deputy of the LVIII Legislature of the Mexican Congress representing Zacatecas.

References

1960 births
2003 deaths
Politicians from Zacatecas
Mexican educators
Members of the Chamber of Deputies (Mexico)
Institutional Revolutionary Party politicians
21st-century Mexican politicians